Ministry of Internal Affairs of Bashkortostan or just The Police of Bashkortostan (Министерство внутренних дел по Республике Башкортостан - полиции Башкортостана) is the interior ministry of Bashkortostan in Russia.

The current Minister is Mikhail Zakomaldin (Since 2011).

Structure
The Unit for combating the Organized crime (Подразделение по борьбе с организованной преступностью)
Directorate of Tax Crimes (Управление по налоговым преступлениям)
Regional Dogs Center (Зональный центр кинологической службы)
Traffic Police (Управление государственной инспекции безопасности дорожного движения)
Direction for Private Protection(Управление вневедомственной охраны)
Personnel Directorate (Управление по работе с личным составом)
Professional Training Center (Центр профессиональной подготовки)
The Ufa Law Institute of MVD (Уфимский юридический институт МВД России)

Regional Divisions
Ufa City Police Department (Управление внутренних дел г.Уфы)
Ufa City Traffic Police (Полк ДПС ГИБДД при УВД г.Уфы)
1st Police Department - Dem Region (Отдел полиции No.1 - Демский район)
2nd Police Department - Kalinin Region (Отдел полиции No.2 - Калининский район)
3rd Police Department - Kirov Region (Отдел полиции No.3 - Кировский район)
4th Police Department - Lenin Region (Отдел полиции No.4 - Ленинский район)
5th Police Department - Ordzhonikidze Region (Отдел полиции No.5 - Орджоникидзевский район)
6th Police Department - October Region (Отдел полиции No.6 - Октябрьский район)
7th Police Department - Soviet Region (Отдел полиции No.7 - Советский район)
Neftekamsk City Police Directorate (УВД по г. Нефтекамск)
Salavat City Police Directorate (УВД по городу Салават)
Strelitamak City Police Directorate (УВД по городу Стерлитамак)
Agidel City Police Department (ОВД по городу Агидель)
Kumertau City Police Department (ОВД по городу Кумертау)
Oktyabersky City Police Department (ОВД по городу Октябрьский)
Sibai Town Police Department (ОВД по городу Сибай)
Baimak City and Region Police Department (ОВД по Баймакскому району и городу Баймак)
Belebay City and Region Police Department (ОВД по Белебеевскому району и городу Белебей)
Beloretsk City and Region Police Directorate (УВД по Белорецкому району и городу Белорецк)
Birsk City and Region Police Department (ОВД по Бирскому району и городу Бирск)
Blagoveshchensk City and Region Police Department (ОВД по Благовещенскому району и г. Благовещенск)
Davlekanovo City and Region Police Department (ОВД по Давлекановскому району и г. Давлеканово)
Diurtul City and Region Police Department (ОВД по Дюртюлинскому району и г. Дюртюли)
Ishimbai City and Region Police Department (ОВД по Ишимбайскому району и городу Ишимбай)
Meleuoz City and Region Police Department (ОВД по Мелеузовскому району и городу Мелеуз)
Tuimaz City and Region Police Department (ОВД по Туймазинскому району и городу)
Uchaly City and Region Police Department (ОВД по Учалинскому району и городу Учалы)
Yanaul City and Region Police Department (ОВД по Янаульскому району и г. Янаул)

Interior Ministries
Interior People's Commissars
 Fatykh Tukhvtullin (1919–1920)
 Semyon Lobov (1920)
 Ivan Kashirin (1920–1921)
 Alexey Pirozhnikov (1921)
 Abdullah Adigamov (April–June 1921)
 Ahmed-Yasaviy Gumerov (1921–1922)
 Nikolay Sokolov (1922–1923)
Shagit Khudaiberdin (1923–1924)
Ismahil Sultaov (1925–1927)
 Shakir Abdullov (1927–1929)
Shaikhiy Kharrasov (1929–1930)
Nabiulla Bairamgulov (1930)
Matvey Pogrebinsky (1930–1933)
Nakhum Zelikman (1933–1937)
German Lupekin (1937)
Solomon Bak (April–October 1937)
Alexander Medvedev (1937–1939)
Alexey Sokolov (1939–1941; 1941–1943)
Ivan Kudryakov) (1941)
Dmitry Babenko (1943–1949)
Condratiy Firsanov (1949–1954)
Interior Ministers
Pavel Matveevsky (1954)
Ivan Kojin (1954–1962)
Vladimir Rylenko (1962–1987)
Fyodor Semiletov (1987–1990)
Anas Khasanov (1991–1995)
Raul Fairuzov (1995–1996)
Raphael Divaev (1996–2008)
Mikhail Zakomaldin (Since 2011)

External links
official homepage

Government of Bashkortostan
Government ministries of Bashkortostan
Bashkortostan